Pichichi may refer to

 Pichichi (footballer) (1892–1922), Spanish footballer
 Pichichi Trophy – a trophy named in honour of the above awarded to the top goalscorer in Spain's La Liga each season
 

fr:Meilleurs buteurs du championnat d'Espagne de football#Classement des Pichichi par saison